Ootakemaru (大嶽丸, also sometimes called 鬼神魔王、大だけ丸、or 大竹丸) is a figure in Japanese folklore. He resides on Suzuka Mountain, a connection of mountains and ravines bordering the Ise and Oumi countries, as a Kijin [jp]. He lived during the reign of Emperor Kanmu (781-806) and was one of the chief enemies of shogun Sakanoue no Tamuramaro. Ootakemaru mostly connected to the story of Sakanoue no Tamuromaro's oni extermination.  He is considered one of the Great Three Evil Yokai of Japan [jp] alongside Shuten-dōji and Tamamo-no-Mae, though some version of the list replace Ootakemaru with Sutoku-tenno.

Ootakemaru was said to be able to manipulate the weather such as storms and thunder, capable of creating dark clouds to cover Suzuka Mountain that rained fire.

References

Attribution
 Content in this edit is translated from the existing Japanese Wikipedia article at :jp:大嶽丸; see its history for attribution.

Japanese folklore